Karl Zischek (28 August 1910 – 6 October 1985) was an Austrian footballer who played as a forward for Austria in the 1934 FIFA World Cup. He also played for SC Wacker Wien.

References

External links 
FIFA profile

1910 births
1985 deaths
Austrian footballers
Austria international footballers
Association football forwards
FC Admira Wacker Mödling players
1934 FIFA World Cup players